Daniel Ebenezer Kwasi Agyei (born 1 June 1997) is an English footballer who plays as a forward for EFL League Two club Crewe Alexandra.

Career

Burnley
Agyei came through the ranks at AFC Wimbledon, scoring 35 goals for the club's under-21 team in the 2014–15 season to draw the attention of a host of top clubs, reportedly including West Ham United, Chelsea and Fulham. Agyei eventually signed for Burnley on a long-term contract, initially to play for the club's development squad.

After impressing for Burnley's development squad in the 2015–16 season and making his senior Burnley debut in a pre-season friendly against Bradford City, Agyei was made available for a loan move by manager Sean Dyche. Coventry City beat off competition from several clubs in League One and the Championship to secure the loan signing of Agyei on a five-month loan deal. Agyei was handed the number 9 shirt by Coventry City manager Tony Mowbray upon arrival at the Ricoh Arena.

Agyei made his professional league debut against Bradford City on 20 August 2016, handing Coventry City the lead with his first goal in professional league football in a 3–1 defeat at Valley Parade. He then scored his second goal of the season in a 2–0 home win against Rochdale. In October 2016, he scored Coventry's fastest-ever goal at the Ricoh Arena after just 19.5 seconds in a 3–1 victory over Northampton Town in the EFL Trophy. In January 2017, he returned to Burnley following the expiration of his loan, having made a total of 19 appearances and scored five goals for the Sky Blues.

He made his Burnley debut on 12 March 2017, coming on in the 88th minute to replace Scott Arfield against Liverpool.

On 31 August 2017, Agyei joined League One club Walsall on loan until January 2018. He made a total of 21 appearances in all competitions, scoring five goals, before returning to Burnley.

On 18 January 2018, Agyei joined League One club Blackpool on loan until the end of the 2017–18 season.

Oxford United
On 10 August 2019, Agyei joined League One club Oxford United on a three-year deal, with compensation to be paid to Burnley, after turning down a new contract at the Premier League club. He made his first-team debut in an EFL Trophy group-stage victory over Norwich City U21 on 3 September 2019, and his league debut as a 78th-minute substitute in a 0–0 draw away at Bolton Wanderers on 17 September.

Crewe Alexandra
On 28 January 2022, Agyei joined Crewe Alexandra on an 18-month contract for an undisclosed fee, and made his debut in Crewe's 1–0 league defeat at Gillingham on 1 February 2022. He scored his first Crewe goal, a late consolation goal in a 4–1 defeat at Accrington Stanley, on 12 February 2022. After Crewe were relegated to League Two, Agyei scored in both of Crewe's first two games of the 2022–2023 season.

Career statistics

References

External links
 
 

Living people
1997 births
English people of Ghanaian descent
English footballers
Footballers from Kingston upon Thames
Association football forwards
AFC Wimbledon players
Burnley F.C. players
Coventry City F.C. players
Walsall F.C. players
Blackpool F.C. players
Oxford United F.C. players
Crewe Alexandra F.C. players
English Football League players
Premier League players
Black British sportspeople